A Study in Choreography for Camera is a 1945 American experimental silent short film directed by Maya Deren. Shot in black-and-white, the film stars Talley Beatty.

Cast
 Talley Beatty

References

External links

1945 films
1945 short films
American black-and-white films
Films directed by Maya Deren